Pinehurst Apartments, also known as Pine Street Place and Pine Terrace, is a historic apartment complex located in the Spruce Hill neighborhood of Philadelphia, Pennsylvania. It was built in 1914, and consists of two 3 1/2-story, reinforced concrete buildings faced in brick and granite.  The buildings feature colonnaded porches with Corinthian order columns.

It was added to the National Register of Historic Places in 1987.

References

Residential buildings on the National Register of Historic Places in Philadelphia
Residential buildings completed in 1914
Spruce Hill, Philadelphia